Happyland is an unincorporated community in Pontotoc County, Oklahoma, United States.

Happyland has frequently been noted on lists of unusual place names. Sign theft of the Happyland sign has been reported.

References

Unincorporated communities in Pontotoc County, Oklahoma
Unincorporated communities in Oklahoma